) is a city located in Hyōgo Prefecture, Japan.

Geography
Itami is located in south-eastern Hyōgo Prefecture, with the Ina River to the east and the Muko River to the west. The city area is a flat, undulating gentle terrain throughout. JR West Japan JR Takarazuka Line (also known as the Fukuchiyama Line) and Hankyū Itami Line traverse north and south. In Hyōgo prefecture, the population density is the second highest following Amagasaki in the south.

Neighboring municipalities
Hyōgo Prefecture
Amagasaki
Nishinomiya
Takarazuka
Kawanishi
Osaka Prefecture
Ikeda
Toyonaka

Climate
Itami has a Humid subtropical climate (Köppen Cfa) characterized by warm summers and cool winters with light snowfall.  The average annual temperature in Itami is 15.0 °C. The average annual rainfall is 1475 mm with September as the wettest month. The temperatures are highest on average in January, at around 26.9 °C, and lowest in January, at around 3.7 °C.

Demographics
Per Japanese census data, the population of Itami has been increasing steadily since the 1950s.

History
The area of modern Itami is part of ancient Settsu Province and the hilly area is called the Itami plateau, between the Ina River and the Muko River have been continuously inhabited since the Japanese Paleolithic period. Stone tools, Jomon pottery and Yayoi pottery and settlement traces have been found in several areas within the city limits, and rice cultivation was done in the area from ancient times. The names 'Inano', 'Inabe' and 'Ina Prefecture', all of appear to be variants of 'Itami' appear in the Nihon Shoki and in waka poems from the Naraand Heian periods. In the northern part of the city, the Itami temple ruins date from between the Nara period to the Kamakura period.

The center of Itami became a wealthy castle town by the middle of Sengoku period with the construction of Arioka Castle, held by Araki Murashige ruled under Oda Nobunaga. After the uprising and defeat of Araki, the castle was torn down. During the Edo Period, the town was taken over by the Konoe family of court nobility, and the sake brewing industry prospered under its protection.

Following the Meiji restoration, the holdings of the Konoe family were incorporated into Hyōgo Prefecture. The town of Itami was established 1 April 1889 with the creation of the modern municipalities system. Itami was raised to city status on 10 November 1940. Great portions of the city were damaged in the Great Hanshin–Awaji earthquake of 1995, but were quickly rebuilt.

Government
Itami has a mayor-council form of government with a directly elected mayor and a unicameral city council of 28 members. Itami contributes three members to the Hyōgo Prefectural Assembly. In terms of national politics, the city is in the Hyōgo 6th districts of the lower house of the Diet of Japan.

Economy
Together with the adjacent Yamamoto district of Takarazuka, the horticultural industry in Itami  is one of the three major plant production areas in Japan. The cherry trees planted along the Potomac River in the United States were grown using Itami cherry trees as rootstocks.The city has a mixed economy of commerce, industry and is also a commuter town for Osaka.

Industry
The history of  brewing in Itami is very old, having been done since the Muromachi period. In the Edo period, the  brewed in Itami was popular.  remains a significant contributor to the local economy.

Education
Itami has 17 public elementary schools and eight public middle schools operated by the city government, and five public high schools operated by the Hyōgo Prefectural Board of Education. In addition, the city also operates one and the prefecture operates two special education school for the handicapped. The Otemae College, a junior college, is located in the city.

There is a North Korean school in Itami: Itami Korean Elementary School.

Transportation

Airports
Most of Osaka International Airport is located in Itami (hence its common name "Itami Airport"); it is Osaka's primary domestic airport, after all international flights and some domestic flights shifted to Kansai International Airport in 1994. Despite the airport's association with Itami, the terminal complex is located in the neighboring city of Toyonaka and the Itami city center is connected to the airport only by a long tunnel that passes beneath the runway and tarmac.

Railways 
 JR West - Fukuchiyama Line
  -  
 Hankyu - Itami Line
  -  - 
 Osaka Monorail - Nissei Line

Highways 
  Meishin Expressway
   Chūgoku Expressway
 Hanshin Expressway

Sister city relations
 Hasselt, Belgium
 Foshan, China

Local attractions

Inano Shrine
Koya temple
Arioka Castle Ruins
Koyoike Park
Itami Sky Park
Aramaki rose park
Miyamena Cultural Towns Itami-shi Itami-cho Town Pavilion, Town Old Okada Family with  Brewery (Important Cultural Property of the Country)
Itami City Library
Itami City Museum of Art
Itami City Museum of Insects

Culture and regular events

Itami Machinakanaka Bar is an eating and drinking event in the city center of Itami. It held twice a year, in spring and autumn, and musicians can often be found performing in the streets during the event.
Nakumushi to Go-cho is a Japanese poetry event in autumn. In the Itami city center, the "insect hearing" event is held every September. At this event, various events related to "insect hearing" occur—such as music concerts, study sessions, reading books, and workshops—over the course of a few weeks.

Notable people from Itami

Uejima Onitsura (1661–1738), Japanese haiku poet of the Edo period
Yoko Minamino (1967–), Japanese actress and singer
Masami Okui (1968–), Japanese singer-songwriter
Akira Ueda (1970–), Japanese video game designer and founder of Audio, Inc.
Aiko Uemura (1979–), Japanese mogul skier
Hiroyuki Nakajima (1982–), Japanese professional baseball player
Katsuki Yamazaki (1982–), Japanese professional baseball player
Masahiro Tanaka (1988–), Japanese professional baseball player
Hayato Sakamoto (1988–), Japanese professional baseball player
Kasumi Arimura (1993–), Japanese actress

References

External links

 
 Itami City Museum of Art
 Itami City Museum of Insects

 
Cities in Hyōgo Prefecture